The following is a list of publications in the 1632 series of alternate history fiction. For Grantville Gazettes, please see The Grantville Gazettes.

Novels published by Baen Books

Anthologies published by Baen Books

Grantville Gazettes

Other Works

Books published by Ring of Fire Press

References 

 
1632 series books
Book series introduced in 2000
 
Fiction set in the 1630s